Category 0 can refer to:

 Empty category 0, the category of no objects and no morphisms, is the initial object of the category of small categories is the empty category
 Category [0], a simplex category
 Category 0 triage (Japan) - for victims who are dead, or whose injuries make survival unlikely.
 Category 0 of Grade 0 peripheral artery disease - asymptomatic
 Category 0 psychics in Psycho Busters - chronodivers, who have the ability to stop and reverse time and change the past
 Category 0 cultural heritage assets (Belarus) - inscribed or proposed for inscription on the World Heritage List
 Category "0" vessel - allowing unrestricted operation in the world's oceans
 Category 0 in "End of the Road" (Torchwood)
 Category 0 of the ILO International Classification of Radiographs of Pneumoconioses - the absence of small opacity

See also 

 Category O
 Category 1 (disambiguation)